JoAnn Windholz is an American politician from the state of Colorado. A Republican, Windholz served one term in the Colorado House of Representatives, representing District 30.

Windholz is from Commerce City, Colorado. She ran for the Colorado House in 2014, and defeated incumbent Jenise May in the general election by 106 votes.

Following the Colorado Springs Planned Parenthood shooting, Windholz suggested that Planned Parenthood was the "true instigator" of the attack.

In the 2016 general election, Windholz lost to Democratic challenger Dafna Michaelson Jenet. Windholz received 45.81% of the vote to Michaelson Jenet's 54.19%.

References

External links

Living people
People from Commerce City, Colorado
Republican Party members of the Colorado House of Representatives
Women state legislators in Colorado
21st-century American politicians
21st-century American women politicians
Year of birth missing (living people)